The 2016 Morehead State Eagles football team represented Morehead State University in the 2016 NCAA Division I FCS football season. They were led by fourth-year head coach Rob Tenyer and played their home games at Jayne Stadium. They were members of the Pioneer Football League. They finished the season 4–7, 3–5 in PFL play to finish in a two-way tie for seventh place.

Schedule

Game summaries

at James Madison

VMI

Lincoln

at Drake

Valparaiso

at Dayton

Marist

Jacksonville

at Butler

Campbell

at Davidson

References

Morehead State
Morehead State Eagles football seasons
Morehead State Eagles football